Paul Bartlett may refer to:

Paul Bartlett (painter) (1881–1965), American landscape painter
Paul Alexander Bartlett (1909–1990), American writer and poet
Paul Doughty Bartlett (1907–1997), American chemist
Paul Wayland Bartlett (1865–1925), American sculptor